Biete Abba Libanos (House of Abbot Libanos) is an underground rock-cut monolith Orthodox church located in Lalibela, Ethiopia. It was built during the Kingdom of Axum. It is part of UNESCO World Heritage Site at Lalibela.

3D model based on laser scanning 
The Biete Abba Libanos was spatially documented in 2007 by the non-profit research group Zamani Project, which specialises in 3D digital documentation of tangible cultural heritage. A 3D model can be viewed on their website. The data generated by the Zamani Project creates a permanent record that can be used for research, education, restoration, and conservation.

References

External links 
 3D Model created by the Zamani Project.

Rock-Hewn Churches, Lalibela